Bleptina inferior, the inferior owlet moth, is a species of moth in the family Erebidae. It was described by Augustus Radcliffe Grote in 1872 and is found in North America, where it has been recorded from Iowa to Massachusetts, south to Texas and Florida.

The wingspan is 22–26 mm.

The MONA or Hodges number for Bleptina inferior is 8371.

References

Further reading
 Arnett, Ross H. (2000). American Insects: A Handbook of the Insects of America North of Mexico. CRC Press.
 Lafontaine, J. Donald & Schmidt, B. Christian (2010). "Annotated check list of the Noctuoidea (Insecta, Lepidoptera) of North America north of Mexico". ZooKeys, vol. 40, 1–239.

External links
Butterflies and Moths of North America
NCBI Taxonomy Browser, Bleptina inferior

Herminiinae
Moths described in 1872